Coprolith may mean:

 Coprolite, fossilised dung
 Fecaloma, a hardened piece of fæces, symptomatic of certain illnesses.